The Premier League is an English professional league for association football clubs. At the top of the English football league system, it is the country's primary football competition and is contested by 20 clubs. Seasons run from August to May, with teams playing 38 matches each, totalling 380 matches in the season. Most games are played on Saturdays and Sundays, with games also played on certain weekday evenings.

The competition was formed in February 1992 following the decision of clubs in the Football League First Division to break away from The Football League, in order to take advantage of a lucrative television rights deal. Teams competing in the Premier League may qualify for the UEFA Champions League or UEFA Europa League on virtue of league positions. The competition adopts a promotion and relegation system with the Football League which comes into place at the end of each season. Since the inaugural season in 1992–93, 50 teams have competed in the Premier League. At the end of the 1994–95 season, the league was reduced from 22 teams to 20.

Seven clubs have won the title: Manchester United (13 times), Manchester City (6), Chelsea (5), Arsenal (3), Blackburn Rovers, Leicester City and Liverpool (1): Manchester United was the first club to win the league three consecutive seasons twice (1998–99 to 2000–01 and 2006–07 to 2008–09) and Arsenal was the only team to go an entire season without a single defeat in 2003–04. The record number of points accumulated by a team is 100 by Manchester City, who won the Premier League in 2017–18. Norwich City have been relegated the most times (6) while Derby County accumulated the lowest ever points total with 11 in the 2007–08 season. 

The Premier League Golden Boot, awarded to the top goalscorer each season, has been won by 25 players from 12 different clubs. Andy Cole and Alan Shearer have both scored 34 goals in a 42-game season – the most in a Premier League season. Mohamed Salah holds the record in a 38-game season with 32. Dutchman Jimmy Floyd Hasselbaink was the first foreigner to win the award outright in 2000–01 having shared the accolade with Dwight Yorke of Trinidad and Tobago in 1998–99.

History

Champions 

In the inaugural season of the Premier League Manchester United finished 10 points clear of Aston Villa to win their first league championship in over 26 years. The club successfully retained the title in 1993–94, leading the table after beating Aston Villa 3-9
in the third gameweek. Manchester United also completed a league and cup double, beating Chelsea 4–0 in the FA Cup final. Blackburn Rovers under the investment of owner Jack Walker and manager Kenny Dalglish won their first championship since 1913–14 on the final day of the 1994–95 season. 

Despite Blackburn losing to Liverpool, Manchester United – in second place and two points behind the leaders before kick-off had failed to capitalise on the result, drawing at West Ham United. Manchester United however regained the Premier League in 1995–96 after much scrutiny over the inexperience of the first team at the beginning of the season. Newcastle United who held a 12-point lead at the top in January 1996 were pegged back in the following weeks before Manchester United moved in front at the end of March.

Manchester United retained the league in 1996–97 but were overhauled by Arsenal in the final ten weeks of the 1997–98 season, finishing second. Arsenal, managed by Arsène Wenger in his first full season at the club also beat Newcastle 2–0 in the FA Cup final to win the trophy and accomplish a double. They however failed to retain both trophies as Manchester United pipped Arsenal on the final day of the league season, winning the Premier League as well as defeating the holders in a FA Cup semi-final replay. United won the league for two successive seasons: in 1999–2000 ending the season 18 points in front and 2000–01 by 10. After four seasons without a trophy, Arsenal again completed a league and cup double in 2001–02 remarkably scoring in every single Premier League match. The title the following season was won by Manchester United, with striker Ruud van Nistelrooy scoring 25 goals in 38 league matches.

In the summer of 2003, Chelsea were taken over by businessman Roman Abramovich and despite the club spending over £100m on new players, the 2003–04 champions were Arsenal, who became the first Premier League club to win the league without defeat. Chelsea's failure to finish first culminated in managerial changes: coach Claudio Ranieri was sacked and subsequently replaced with Portuguese José Mourinho. The club won the league in 2004–05, 12 points ahead of runners-up Arsenal, scoring 72 goals and conceding 15 in the process. Chelsea won a second successive Premier League title in 2005–06 before Manchester United became the third different club to win the league in four seasons in 2006–07. 

Despite Arsenal leading the division for much of the 2007–08 season, Manchester United retained the championship on the final day of the season and won their eleventh Premier League title in 2008–09 after much competition from Liverpool. Chelsea reclaimed the league in 2009–10, scoring a record 103 goals and won the FA Cup to end the season as double winners. In May 2011, Manchester United won their 12th Premier League title and a record 19th after drawing away to Blackburn Rovers.

Promotion and relegation 

Nottingham Forest were the first team relegated from the Premier League in the 1992–93 season, losing 2–0 at home to Sheffield United on 1 May 1993. They were joined by Middlesbrough and Crystal Palace, with the latter club relegated on goal difference. Newcastle United and West Ham United were both automatically promoted from the First Division while Swindon Town triumphed in the playoffs.

Blackburn Rovers are the only Premier League champions to have been subsequently relegated from the league, in 1998–99 and 2011–12, although Leicester City (most recently in 2003–04) and Manchester City (most recently in 2000–01) had been relegated from the Premier League prior to winning their first titles.

Top goalscorer 

The top goalscorer in the Premier League at the end of each season is awarded the Premier League Golden Boot, known for sponsorship reasons as the Barclays Golden Boot. The first recipient was Teddy Sheringham of Tottenham Hotspur, who scored 21 goals in 40 games for the club as well as an additional goal for Nottingham Forest on the opening day of the season. Andy Cole scored 34 goals for Newcastle United in 1993–94 before Alan Shearer won three consecutive awards: twice for Blackburn Rovers including their league-winning season and once for Newcastle United in 1996–97.

Chris Sutton, Michael Owen and Dion Dublin of Blackburn Rovers, Liverpool and Coventry City respectively were the joint recipients of the Golden Boot the following season, with 18 goals apiece. Owen again shared the accolade, scoring 18 goals in 1998–99 with Manchester United striker Dwight Yorke and Leeds forward Jimmy Floyd Hasselbaink. In 1999–2000, the award was given to Kevin Phillips of newly promoted Sunderland, scoring 30 goals in 36 games. At a strike rate of 0.83, he was also awarded the European Golden Shoe.

Hasselbaink was the winner in 2000–01, scoring 23 goals for Chelsea in 35 appearances. Thierry Henry of Arsenal picked up the prize a year later with 24 goals and Manchester United striker Ruud van Nistelrooy was the awardee in 2002–03, scoring one more than the previous season's tally. Henry picked up three successive Golden Boots in 2003–04, 2004–05 and 2005–06 scoring 30, 25 and 27 goals respectively. Chelsea striker Didier Drogba was the top goalscorer in 2006–07 with 20 goals and Manchester United midfielder Cristiano Ronaldo contributed to his team's success in 2007–08, scoring 31 goals in 34 league games; a strike rate of 0.91. Nicolas Anelka of Chelsea was the recipient in 2008–09 with 18 goals before his fellow strike partner Drogba won his second Golden Boot the following season with 29 goals. Both Carlos Tevez and Dimitar Berbatov of Manchester City and Manchester United respectively each won their first Golden Boot at the end of the 2010–11 season, scoring 20 goals.

Seasons

Notes

References 

General
 
 
 
 

Bibliography
 

Specific

External links 
 

 
Seasons